Zimone (Zimon in Piedmontese is a comune (municipality) in the Province of Biella in the Italian region Piedmont, located about  northeast of Turin and about  southwest of Biella.

Zimone borders the following municipalities: Cerrione, Magnano, Piverone, Roppolo, Viverone.

References

Cities and towns in Piedmont